The third season of The Masked Singer based on the Masked Singer franchise which originated from the South Korean version of the show King of Mask Singer. It premiered on VTM on 3  February 2023 and is hosted by Jens Dendoncker.

The season started with the best ratings since its debut, with almost 2 million viewers.

Production
After the success of the first two seasons, even named the biggest success of broadcoaster VTM ever, a third season was ordered. It was announced that Jens Dendoncker, who was a judge in the previous seasons, would be the new host. A first trailer of the season was released 6 January 2023. It was filmed in a castle.

There were some changes. There were fourteen contestants this season, more than the previous seasons. For the first time the contestants were split into two groups of seven. Only the last remaining four contestants of each group, would join the final group of eight contestants towards the final.

Before the first episode, the audience could already hear the voices of the contestants since audio fragments were released.

Cast

Panelists
Panel members Julie Van den Steen, Andy Peelman and Kevin Janssens returned. Bart Cannaerts and Tine Embrechts,  who participated at the previous season as masked singers, joined the panel. Of this group of 5 judges, a few of them would be selected for each episode.

Contestants 
The first eight contestants were introduced on 13 January.

The other six characters were revealed in many ways. A new character, Cosmos, appeared on a mural in Antwerp on 17 January 2023. Three new characters performed at an exclusive party on 21 January. On 25 January a new character, Mummy, was heard on several radio stations.  The last contestant, Butterfly, was revealed in Leuven on 1 February and on 2 February online.

Episodes

Episode 1 (3 February)
Group number: "Uptown Funk" by Bruno Mars

Episode 2 (10 February)
Group number: "Take On Me" by A-ha

Episode 3 (17 February)

Episode 4 (24 February)

Episode 5 (3 March)

Episode 6 (10 March)

Episode 7 (17 March)

References

External links
 

Masked Singer
2023 Belgian television seasons